Pandit Raghunath Murmu (05 May 1905 – 1 February 1982) was an Indian Santali writer and educator. He developed the Ol Chiki script for Santali language. Until the nineteenth century, Santali people had no written language and knowledge was transmitted orally from one generation to other. Later European researchers and Christian missionaries started to use Bengali, Odia, and Roman scripts to document the Santali language. However, Santalis did not have their own script. His development of the Ol Chiki script enriched the cultural identity of the Santali society. He wrote many songs, plays and school text books in the Ol Chiki script.

Biography
Raghunath Murmu was born on the day of Baisakhi Purnima (Buddha Purnima), 1905 in the Dandbose (Dahardih) village (near Rairangpur town) of Mayurbhanj State (now in Odisha), India. He is the son of Nandlal Murmu and Salma Murmu. His father, Nandlal Murmu, was a village head and his paternal uncle was a Munsi in the court of King Pratap Chandra Bhanjdeo of Mayurbhanj State. As per the traditional social rituals of the Santal people (known as the Kherwal community), he was named Chunu Murmu after his birth. However, later the priest, who performed his naming ceremony, changed his name from Chunu Murmu to Raghunath Murmu.

Early life: education and the invention of the Ol Chiki script
At the age of seven, he went to the Gambharia U.P. School (an Odia-language school, 3 km away from his village) for his primary education. On the first day of school, he found his teacher to be an Odiya. He started wondering why was the school not operating in the language in which he spoke, Santali. He used to say - why should we learn in this language? Odiya is a teaching medium for Odiya-speaking people. We are Kherwal, and Santali is our mother language 'so' why are we not taught in Santali?. He told his father to admit him in a Santali medium school. His father then told him that Santali does not have any written script, it is an oral language. At that age, he started to think - why don't we have our own script? why are we not taught in our language?. These questions always kept buzzed in his mind.

In 1914, he was admitted to the Bahalda Primary School (7 km away from his village). As this school is quite far from his native village, he built a hut near the school on a relative's land in Bana Dungri. He started to stay there with some other boys. During these days, while other children used to play together in nearby playground, he did not play with them. He used to play alone in soil, drawing different shapes on earth, writing alphabets. He used to learn through his play. This is probably the time when he started developing the script Ol Chiki.

He was sent to Baripada (capital city of then Mayurbhanj State) for further study. He took admission in the Baripada High School of Mayurbhanj (present M.K.C. High School). But here too his mind was stuck with the thoughts of having his own language and script. During the school holidays, he used to go home at his native village Danbose. At that time, he used to spend his time alone roaming in a nearby jungle, named Kapi-Buru. Generally, no one ventured into that isolated Kapi-Buru jungle. He would often go off into Kapi-Buru with his notebook and pen. It is said that he created the Ol Chiki script at Kapi-Buru in 1925.

In 1928, he passed his matriculation examination (10th) from the Patna University. In the same year, he married Nuha Baskey, a resident of Jamjora village.

Middle life: creation of Santali literature using Ol-Chiki script
After his matriculation in 1928, he started a job at the Baripada Power House as an apprentice. During this time, he also built his own house at Baripada. Later P.K. Singh, Dewan of then Mayurbhanj State, sent him Serampore (near Kolkata) to get some industrial training. He took his technical training at three different places of West Bengal- Serampore in Hooghly district, Shantiniketan in Birbhum district, and Gosaba Training Center at South 24 Parganas district. After acquiring the necessary technical education, he was appointed as a teacher at the Baripada Technical Institute. After a brief stint in the technical institute, he joined as a teacher at the Badamtalia Primary School in 1933. Many people believed that he sometimes used Ol Chiki script while teaching in the class. One of his students (son of a carpenter) carved out the letters he wrote on a wooden chapati roller. After applying the ink on that roller, if someone rolls that roller on a paper letters would be printed on that paper. The first book, named Horh Sereng, in Ol Chiki script was published in 1936. Finally a script worth seeing. He published his first play Bidu-Chandan in 1942. In the novel, he described how Bidu (god) and Chandan (Goddess) who came to earth as human beings,  invented the Ol Chiki script in order to express their love for each other using written Santali. This book was exhibited in a function at Baripada where the king of Mayurbhanj State was also invited. King understood the worth of this newly developed script. During this time, he used to stay in the house of Sudhir Majhi at the Bhutadi village. That place is now known as Master Bari. There was also a stage near his house. The first show of his play Bidu Chandan was staged there. Many people came to see his play Bidu Chandan when it was first staged in his native village. Later he also taught at the Gambaria, Bahalda, and Rairangpur high schools. During that period, he used to visit different Santali villages in Mayurbhanj, and Jharkhand and taught the use of his developed Ol Chiki script. In this way, the Ol Chiki script reached out to a large number of Santali peoples. People loved him as a teacher and started calling him Pandit Raghunath Murmu.

During the Swadeshi independence movent in 1942, he got branded as a revolutionary when he was campaigning for his invented Ol Chiki script. He escaped to his wife's native village Jamjora and stayed hidden. He also continued his work of developing Santali literature using Ol Chiki script during that time. On 15 August 1947, India got independence. All king-ruled states are getting integrated into India. During this time, the demand for a Jharkhand state for Santali-speaking people was also gaining momentum. He was an ardent supporter of this Jharkhand Movement. Police firing was also sought to quell the protesters at Kharusan and Gundaria in Mayurbhanj. An arrest warrant was also issued in his name when the demand for Jharkhand was raised at the Baripada Tribal Convention. He left Baripada and went to Karandih Sarjom Tola village (near Jamshedpur). He stayed there in a rented house and started working for the Tata Steel in Jamshedpur. He and his friend Sadhu Murmu together started spreading the knowledge about Ol Chiki script there. Wherever they found a group of 4-5 people, they used to go there and talk about their work in Ol Chiki script. He used to teach villagers how to read and write the Ol Chiki alphabet, during his travel to many places. He also wrote different books Parsi Poha, Parsi Itun, Ranarh, Alkha, Ol Chemed etc for learning Ol Chiki.

Last life: honours for his contribution in the Santali literature
He went to his native village to spend the last days of his life. He traveled all his life to spread the use of Ol Chiki script, while his mother-in-law took care of his family and home. In 1956, All India Sarna Conference (People who worship nature is called Sarna) was held in Karandih near Jamshedpur. In this conference, prominent leader Jaipal Singh bestowed him with the title Guru Gomke (the great teacher). He was also honoured by Mayurbhanj State Adivasi Mahasabha with the title "Guru Gomke" (the great teacher). During this time, his brother-in-law Muniram Baskey gifted him a printing machine. He bought different metallic script typefaces (heavy-light-big-small) from Kolkata and started printing his books in the Ol Chiki script. Under his direction, the weekly magazine Saagen Saakam was printed and distributed to spread the Santali literature. He used to say our literature can not progress without Ol Chiki. Baba Tilka Majhi Library was also established under his guidance. He visited many santali-dominated places in West Bengal, Bihar, Assam, and Odisha and taught people about the use of Ol Chiki alphabet (Au-Ote-O-Aung) in phonetics through his songs. Gradually he is able to convince people about the necessity of Ol Chiki script. He also started a non-political organization named SECA (Social-Educational and Cultural Association) to organize meetings at different places where everyone can share their own ideas. Some people now worships Bidu-Chandan (characters of his drama) as God of Knowledge. By offering prayers to the god Bidu with his wife Chandan (goddess) on the confluence of two rivers Jual and Bhangra (near Jhargram), He set the norms and standards which today become a traditional ritual in that region. Even today some people offers prayer to the Bidu-Chandan (God of Knowledge) on the same confluence. He wrote more than 150 plays, short stories, novels and poems in Ol Chiki script.

He got many awards for his path-breaking work in Santali literature and script. Ranchi University awarded him the honorable Doctorate degree for his contribution to Santali literature. On 16 November 1979, the Government of West Bengal (then chief minister Jyoti Basu) honored him by giving him a bronze (copper) medal at the Kundbona ground of Hura in the Purulia district. An organization named Dhumkuriya Ranchi also gave him the title D.Lit. Odiya Sahitya Academy also awarded him for his literary contribution. Prof. Martin Orens, a distinguished anthropologist of the University of California USA, called him a Theologian (Spiritual Guru). Mr. M.D. Julius Tigga called him a Great developer and Dramatist. The greatest award he got is the love and respect of the people for his unique contribution towards his own language and community. He actually gave the identity to his own Kherwal community via Ol Chiki script.

He died on 2 February 1982.

Notable works
His most notable work is the development of Ol Chiki script itself. However, there are also some other notable works regarding the Santali literature and script. These works are - Ol Chemed (primary syllabus of Ol Chiki), Parsi Poha (essential elements of  Ol Chiki), Dare Ge Dhon (drama), Sidu Kanhu (patriotic drama), Bidu Chandan (famous love drama), Kherwal Bir (patriotic drama), Hital (scripture of evolution of the Earth and human being of Kherwals myth), Hor Sereng (Santali literature songs), Ronor (Santali grammar), Elkha (Santali mathematics). His first book is the Hor Sereng and his first book on play is the Bidu Chandan. His last book is Rah Andorh.

Legacy
He has not only given a new identity to the Santali society but also has laid an inspiration for other societies to create their own script. Because of this inspiration, many societies are now able to develop their own script. The Government of India has included the Santali language in the Eighth Schedule of the constitution of India on 22 December 2003. After that, many state governments of India, specifically West Bengal, Jharkhand, Odisha, and Bihar, gave recognition to the Santali language. The government of Jharkhand, Odisha, and West Bengal included the Santali language as a medium of instruction at the primary and high school levels in the santal-dominated area. Many universities and colleges of Jharkhand, West Bengal and Odisha are now offering courses on the Santali literature using Ol Chiki script.

In 2016, Odisha chief minister declared the birthday of Pandit Raghunath Murmu (every year full moon day on the month of May which is popularly called as "Guru Kunami", "Guru Purnima" and "Basant Kunami" ) as an optional holiday''.

References

External links 
 

1905 births
1982 deaths
Adivasi writers
Creators of writing systems
Writers from Odisha
People from Mayurbhanj district
20th-century Indian linguists
20th-century Indian dramatists and playwrights
Santali people
Santali writers
Indian educators